Gruber's Grinder a mountain bike trail in Holly, Michigan, United States.

Paul Gary Gruber was born and lived in Michigan.  Once a hard core mountain bike rider and racer, he took second place with Tail Wind Production and the MMBA Points Series.   He was instrumental in developing a race venue that included bike races at the Big M and Owasippi trails.  Gruber mapped off, designed, developed and built this mountain bike path at Holly Recreation Area in Southeast Michigan.  This very technical trail measures 15.6 miles long.  It is a tight, twisty, single track.

External links
Michigan Department of Natural Resources Holly-Holdridge Mountain Bike Trail
Holdridge Trail Information
MMBA Trail Guide
3Diciplins - Grubers Grinder
Holly Recreation Area

Mountain biking venues in the United States
Protected areas of Oakland County, Michigan